The Reynard 98I is an open-wheel racing car designed and built by Reynard Racing Cars that competed in the 1998 IndyCar season. It won the constructors' and drivers' titles later that year, being driven by Alex Zanardi.

References

Reynard Motorsport vehicles
American Championship racing cars